Raúl Eduardo Esparza (born October 24, 1970) is a Cuban-American stage, screen, and voice actor, as well as singer. Considered one of Broadway's leading men since the 2000s, he is best known for his Tony Award-nominated performance as Bobby in the 2006 Broadway revival of Company and for his television role as New York Assistant District Attorney (ADA) Rafael Barba in Law & Order: Special Victims Unit, where he had a recurring role in Season 14 and was promoted to a series regular in Seasons 15 to 19.

He made his Broadway debut in 2000 as Riff Raff in the revival of The Rocky Horror Show. Subsequently, he starred as Jonathan in the original Off-Broadway production of Tick, Tick... Boom! and Caractacus Potts in the original Broadway production of Chitty Chitty Bang Bang in 2005. He received Tony nominations for his roles as Philip Salon in the Boy George musical Taboo in 2004; Bobby in the musical comedy Company in 2006; Lenny in Harold Pinter's play The Homecoming in 2008; and Charlie Fox in David Mamet's play Speed-the-Plow in 2009. Most recently, he starred in the Off-Broadway production Seared in 2019.

Esparza has been nominated in all Tony categories for which an actor is eligible. He is widely regarded for his versatility on stage, having performed musicals by Andrew Lloyd Webber, Stephen Sondheim, Kander and Ebb, Boy George, the Sherman Brothers and in plays by Mamet, Pinter, William Shakespeare, Tom Stoppard, and more. His film work includes Sidney Lumet's Find Me Guilty and Wes Craven's My Soul to Take, and his television credits include roles on The Path, Medium, Hannibal and Pushing Daisies. He narrated the audiobook for Stephen King's Under the Dome as well as several others, and he sings in concerts across the country.

Early life
Esparza was born in Wilmington, Delaware, to Cuban parents, María Elena Cecilia García y Gutiérrez and Raúl Esparza y Rues, who had left the country because of the Castro regime. While his paternal grandfather had been established in Castro's sugar ministry, his father's family grew disillusioned with the government, and in 1966, his father and grandmother escaped to the U.S. by boat, while his grandfather defected through Spain. Esparza's maternal grandfather had moved to Cuba from Figueres, Alt Empordà, Catalonia, Spain.

Esparza was raised in Miami, Florida. He graduated from Belen Jesuit in 1988 and won a Silver Knight Award in Drama that same year. In 1992, Esparza received a Bachelor of Fine Arts in Drama and a Bachelor's degree in English from New York University's Tisch School of the Arts.

While on Finding Your Roots, Season 8, Episode 2, Esparza learned that his Catalan great-great-grandparents founded Garcia de Pou Restaurant Supply Store in Madrid, Spain, which is still owned and operated by members of his family. He also learned that another branch of his family came from the small town of Navata, Girona, Catalonia, Spain, where they can be traced back 14 generations.

Career

Theatre

Broadway theatre
Esparza first drew attention with his performance in the 2000 Broadway revival of The Rocky Horror Show, which won him the Theatre World Award. Esparza's other Broadway credits include Cabaret (2001), Taboo (2003), Chitty Chitty Bang Bang (2005), and Sondheim's Company (2006). He received a Tony Award nomination for Best Featured Actor in a Musical and a Drama Desk Award for his performance in Taboo. His performance in Company earned him a second Tony nomination, this time for Best Actor in a Musical, as well as his second Drama Desk award. Beginning in November 2007, he appeared in Harold Pinter's play The Homecoming and was Tony-nominated for Best Featured Actor in a Play. In 2008, he played Charlie Fox in the revival of David Mamet's Speed-the-Plow co-starring Jeremy Piven and Elisabeth Moss on Broadway. His performance in Speed-the-Plow earned him a Tony nomination for Best Actor in a Play, making him the second performer (after Boyd Gaines) to be nominated in all four acting categories a performer is eligible for at the Tonys, although he has yet to win one.

Esparza appeared in a limited-engagement revival of Tom Stoppard's Arcadia, which began previews at the Ethel Barrymore Theatre on February 25, 2011, and opened on March 17, 2011.

Esparza appeared in the musical Leap of Faith in the role of the "Reverend" Jonas Nightingale. He was involved in the workshop in 2008, the out-of-town tryout at the Ahmanson Theatre (Los Angeles) in 2010, and the Broadway production in 2012, for which he received a 2012 Drama Desk Award nomination for Outstanding Actor in a Musical.

Other theatre
In 1999, Esparza played Che in the national tour of Evita, opposite Natalie Toro. The tour was intended to open on Broadway, but failed to do so. In 2001, he appeared Off-Broadway in tick, tick... BOOM! by Jonathan Larson, garnering a Drama Desk Award nomination for Outstanding Actor in a Musical. He appeared in two musicals by Stephen Sondheim, Sunday in the Park with George and Merrily We Roll Along at the 2002 Kennedy Center Sondheim Celebration. He also appeared as the Arbiter in the Actors Fund of America concert of Tim Rice's Chess in September 2003.

In 2009, Esparza starred in a production of Shakespeare's Twelfth Night at the Delacorte Theater (New York) with Anne Hathaway, from June 25 through July 12. He starred as Hapgood in the City Center Encores! staged concert production of Anyone Can Whistle from April 8 to 11, 2010, opposite Sutton Foster as Fay and Donna Murphy as the Mayoress.

In July 2013, Esparza starred in a production of The Cradle Will Rock at the New York City Center.

In February 2018, Esparza played Freddie Trumper in the Kennedy Center's revival of Tim Rice's Chess. From October to December 2018, Esparza played the title role in Classic Stage Company's Off-Broadway production of The Resistible Rise of Arturo Ui. He was nominated for the 2019 Drama Desk Award for Best Actor for the role.

In July 2019, Esparza appeared in a production of Road Show at the New York City Center. In October of the same year, Esparza played Harry in the off-Broadway comedy Seared by Theresa Rebeck.

In April 2020 he was a host, executive producer, and performer in Take Me to the World: A Sondheim 90th Celebration, a virtual concert in honor of the 90th birthday of composer Stephen Sondheim benefiting the charity organization ASTEP (Artists Striving to End Poverty).

In December 2022, Esparza was a guest narrator at Disney's Candlelight Processional at Walt Disney World.

Television
In 2007, Esparza had a recurring role on the TV show Pushing Daisies as traveling salesman Alfredo Aldarisio, a role originally given to Paul Reubens. In 2009, Esparza recorded the audiobook Under the Dome by Stephen King. He has done narration for The House of the Scorpion by Nancy Farmer and The Book of Unholy Mischief by Elle Newmark. In January 2010, Esparza performed opposite Lucie Arnaz, Desi Arnaz Jr., and Valarie Pettiford at the 92Y's Lyrics and Lyricist event honoring Desi Arnaz and his orchestra, "Babalu: The American Songbook Goes Latin". In 2010, Esparza appeared as Abel Plenkov in Wes Craven's My Soul to Take.

From 2013 to 2015, Esparza appeared in the recurring role of Dr. Frederick Chilton in Hannibal. He appeared in the 2016 film Custody, written and directed by James Lapine, as an Administration for Children's Services agent.

Law & Order: SVU
In 2012, Esparza became a recurring actor on the long-running NBC drama series Law & Order: Special Victims Unit as Manhattan Assistant District Attorney Rafael Barba, starting in the third episode of the show's 14th season, "Twenty-Five Acts". He appeared in 11 episodes of the show's 14th season. On July 17, 2013, he was promoted to series regular for the show's 15th season. His character became the first series-regular ADA since Stephanie March in the 11th season and the first regular male ADA in series history. His role on SVU was not his first Law & Order role, however, as he had previously portrayed an ADA in a 2009 episode of Law & Order: Criminal Intent, and a suspect in a 2010 episode of the original Law & Order. On February 7, 2018, Esparza left SVU in the episode "The Undiscovered Country” after six seasons on the show.

Although having left the series to return to the stage, Esparza has been back on the show, making a very brief cameo before the main title in the Season 21 episode "Redemption in Her Corner". He made another guest appearance in Season 22 episode "Sightless in a Savage Land" and in the Season 23 Finale, "A Final Call at Forlini's Bar.

Personal life
Esparza married Michele Marie Perez, his high-school girlfriend, in 1994. They divorced in 2007. Esparza was the subject of a New York Times profile in 2006 in which he revealed that he is bisexual.

Filmography

Film

Television

Theater credits 
Selected credits

 1998–99: Evita (20th Anniversary US National Tour) – Che
 2002–01: The Rocky Horror Show; Circle in the Square Theatre (Broadway) – Riff Raff
 2001: Tick, Tick... Boom!; Jane Street Theatre (Off-Broadway) – Jonathan
 2001–02: Cabaret; Studio 54 (Broadway) – The Emcee
 2002: Sunday in the Park with George; Kennedy Center (Washington, D.C.) – George Seurat
 2002: Merrily We Roll Along; Kennedy Center (Washington, D.C.) – Charley Kringas
 2003: Comedians; Samual Beckett Theatre (Off-Broadway) – Gethin Price
 2003–04: Taboo; Plymouth Theatre (Broadway) – Philip Sallon
 2004: The Normal Heart; The Public Theater (Off-Broadway) – Ned Weeks
 2005: Chitty Chitty Bang Bang; Hilton Theatre (Broadway) – Caractacus Potts
 2006: Company; The Cincinnati Playhouse in the Park (Regional) – Robert
 2006–07: Company; Ethel Barrymore Theatre (Broadway) – Robert
 2007–08: The Homecoming; Cort Theatre (Broadway) – Lenny
 2008–09: Speed-the-Plow; Ethel Barrymore Theatre (Broadway) – Charlie Fox
 2009: Twelfth Night; Delacorte Theatre (Shakespeare in the Park) – Orsino
 2010: Leap of Faith; Mark Taper Forum (Los Angeles) – Jonas Nightingale
 2011: Arcadia; Ethel Barrymore Theatre (Broadway) – Valentine Coverly
 2012: Leap of Faith; St. James Theatre (Broadway) – Jonas Nightingale
 2015: Cymbeline; Delacorte Theatre (Shakespeare in the Park) – Iachimo
 2018: The Waves; Powerhouse Theater (Poughkeepsie) – Bernard
 2018: The Resistible Rise of Arturo Ui; Lynn F. Angelson Theater (Off-Broadway) – Arturo Ui
 2019: Seared; MCC Theater (Off-Broadway) – Harry

Awards and nominations

References

External links
 
 
 
 
 Video interview in which Esparza discusses his relationship to Catholicism
 Interview in which Esparza discusses his stage and film work

1970 births
Living people
American entertainers of Cuban descent
American male film actors
American male musical theatre actors
American male Shakespearean actors
American male stage actors
American male television actors
American male voice actors
Bisexual male actors
Drama Desk Award winners
Hispanic and Latino American male actors
LGBT Hispanic and Latino American people
LGBT people from Delaware
Male actors from Miami
Male actors from Wilmington, Delaware
Tisch School of the Arts alumni
Theatre World Award winners
20th-century American male actors
21st-century American male actors
LGBT people from Florida
American bisexual actors
American people of Catalan descent